The SR-1 Vektor also known as the Gyurza (Гюрза, Russian for "blunt-nosed viper") or Serdyukov SPS is a 9×21mm Gyurza semi-automatic pistol designed for the Russian military.

The firearm is currently produced as the SR1M.

Design details
The operating system is based on the Beretta 92, utilizing a dropping block. The frame is polymer and steel. While the SR-1 does not have a traditional manual safety, it is equipped with a grip safety that disengages the trigger mechanism, as well as a trigger safety to prevent fire when the trigger is not depressed. Additionally the hammer must also be placed into half-cock to engage the sear and enable double action firing.

Users

  – Armed Forces of the Kyrgyz Republic
 
Russian Federal Protective Service as of 2003
Federal Security Service as of 2003
GRU (G.U.)

References

Sources 
 А. И. Благовестов. То, из чего стреляют в СНГ: Справочник стрелкового оружия. / под общ.ред. А. Е. Тараса. Минск, «Харвест», 2000. стр.69-71
 А. Б. Жук. Энциклопедия стрелкового оружия: револьверы, пистолеты, винтовки, пистолеты-пулемёты, автоматы. — М.: Воениздат, 2002.

External links
 Serdyukov SPS / Internet Movie Firearms Database

Semi-automatic pistols of Russia